Limnoperna is a genus of bivalves belonging to the family Mytilidae.

The species of this genus are found in Southern America, Southeastern Asia and Australia.

Species:

Limnoperna atrata 
Limnoperna balani 
Limnoperna fortunei 
Limnoperna inconstans 
Limnoperna mangle 
Limnoperna pulex 
Limnoperna sambasensis 
Limnoperna securis 
Limnoperna supoti

References

Mytilidae
Bivalve genera